Jiefang, generally a spelling without tonemarks of Jiěfàng, may refer to:

Jiefang Daily, newspaper of the Shanghai committee of the Chinese Communist Party
 FAW Jiefang, a truck manufacturing company
 Jiefang CA-30, military truck
 the Chinese Communist Revolution, common known in China as the “liberation”

People
Jiefang is the Pinyin romanisation of various Chinese given names, including Jiěfàng and Jiéfāng. People with these names include:

 Sheryl WuDunn, American business executive and writer
 Eryue He, Chinese historical fiction writer

Locations in China
 Jiefang Bridge, in Guangzhou
 Jiefang District, Jiaozuo, Henan

Townships
Jiefang Township, Chizhou, in Guichi District, Chizhou, Anhui
Jiefang Township, Yi'an County, in Yi'an County, Heilongjiang

Subdistricts
Jiefang Subdistrict, Bengbu, in Longzihu District, Bengbu, Anhui
Jiefang Subdistrict, Zhanjiang, in Xiashan District, Zhanjiang, Guangdong
Jiefang Subdistrict, Liuzhou, in Liubei District, Liuzhou, Guangxi
Jiefang Subdistrict, Botou, Hebei
Jiefang Subdistrict, Hegang, in Gongnong District, Hegang, Heilongjiang
Jiefang Subdistrict, Bayannur, in Linhe District, Bayannur, Inner Mongolia
Jiefang Subdistrict, Ganzhou, in Zhanggong District, Ganzhou, Jiangxi
Jiefang Subdistrict, Weinan, in Linwei District, Weinan, Shaanxi
Jiefang Subdistrict, Jiaxing, in Nanhu District, Jiaxing, Zhejiang
Jiefang Subdistrict, Zhoushan, in Dinghai District, Zhoushan, Zhejiang
Jiefang Road Subdistrict, Anyang, in Beiguan District, Anyang, Henan
Jiefang Road Subdistrict, Xinxiang, in Weibin District, Xinxiang, Henan
Jiefang Road Subdistrict, Zhengzhou, in Erqi District, Zhengzhou, Henan
Jiefang Road Subdistrict, Jingzhou, in Shashi District, Jingzhou, Hubei
Jiefang Road Subdistrict, Changsha, in Furong District, Changsha, Hunan
Jiefang Road Subdistrict, Ma'anshan, in Huashan District, Ma'anshan, Jiangsu
Jiefang Road Subdistrict, Jinan, in Lixia District, Jinan, Shandong
Jiefang Road Subdistrict, Linfen, in Yaodu District, Linfen, Shanxi
Jiefang Road Subdistrict, Tianjin, in Binhai New Area, Tianjin
Jiefang Road Subdistrict, Altay, in Altay City, Xinjiang
Jiefang Road Subdistrict, Yining, in Yining City, Xinjiang

Other uses
 China Railways JF, a class of steam locomotives